A list of films produced in Egypt in 1998. For an A-Z list of films currently on Wikipedia, see :Category:Egyptian films.

External links
 Egyptian films of 1998 at the Internet Movie Database
 Egyptian films of 1998 elCinema.com

Lists of Egyptian films by year
1998 in Egypt
Lists of 1998 films by country or language